Kiwuri (Aymara  canine tooth or tusk, -ri a suffix, also spelled Quibure) is a  mountain in the Bolivian Andes. It is located in the Potosí Department, Antonio Quijarro Province, Porco Municipality, northwest of the village of Qullpa (Kollpa). The Ch'unchull Mayu originates near the mountain. It flows along its western slope.

References 

Mountains of Potosí Department